I. B. Sathish is the member of 14th Kerala Legislative Assembly. He represents Kattakkada constituency and belongs to Communist Party of India (Marxist). He won by defeating N. Sakthan, speaker of the 13th Kerala Legislative Assembly by a margin of 849 votes.

References

Living people
Kerala MLAs 2016–2021
Politicians from Thiruvananthapuram
Communist Party of India (Marxist) politicians from Kerala
Year of birth missing (living people)